Cannabis in Togo is illegal.

Cultivation
A 1995 report noted that cannabis was Togo's only drug crop, and was not exported.

References

Togo
Drugs in Togo